Imarti Devi (born 14 April 1975) is an Indian politician and a member of the Bharatiya Janata Party. She had served as Minister of Women and Child Development in Madhya Pradesh Government, first in Kamal Nath's Congress government from December 2018 to March 2020, and later under Shivraj Chauhan's BJP government from July 2020 to November 2020. She lost the 2020 Madhya Pradesh Legislative Assembly by-elections from Dabra against the Suresh Raje of Indian National Congress.

Political career
She started her political career by becoming the Sr. Vice-President of District IYC, Gwalior in 1997.

During 2004–2009 she was a member of District Panchayat, Gwalior and is the chairperson of Block Congress Dabra since 2005.
She was elected to Madhya Pradesh Legislative Assembly for the first time in 2008. She subsequently got re-elected in 2013 assembly elections.

In December 2018, She was inducted into the Kamal Nath cabinet as Public Health and Family Welfare of Madhya Pradesh. During 2020 Madhya Pradesh political crisis, She supported senior Congress leader Jyotiraditya Scindia and was one of the 22 MLAs who resigned.

Personal life
She is married to Puran Singh Suman and has one daughter.

Legal Affairs
In November 2016, Gwalior sessions court had ordered to book Imarti Devi, as she was accused of harassing her nephew's wife for dowry. Later on she  succeeded in getting stay on the proceedings by High Court and finally she was acquitted from all the charges with the help of her Advocate Yash Sharma.

References

See also

Madhya Pradesh Legislative Assembly
2013 Madhya Pradesh Legislative Assembly election
2008 Madhya Pradesh Legislative Assembly election

1975 births
Living people
Madhya Pradesh MLAs 2008–2013
21st-century Indian women politicians
21st-century Indian politicians
People from Gwalior
Madhya Pradesh MLAs 2018–2023
Bharatiya Janata Party politicians from Madhya Pradesh
Indian National Congress politicians from Madhya Pradesh
Women members of the Madhya Pradesh Legislative Assembly